Leskov Island is a small uninhabited island in the Traversay Islands group of the South Sandwich Islands. It was discovered in 1819 by a Russian expedition under Fabian Gottlieb von Bellingshausen, who named it for the third lieutenant on the expedition ship Vostok.

Leskov is located to the west of the main island arc of the South Sandwich Islands, and is composed of andesitic rather than basaltic lava with its highest peak reaching . The subduction zone forming the South Sandwich Trench lies to the east of the island arc.

The island is small and has only two named features, both named by the UK Antarctic Place-Names Committee in 1971. Bowsprit Point is the island's northeast point, named for its resemblance to a bowsprit, or prow of a ship. Rudder Point is the island's high, rocky southeast point, named in association with Bowsprit (as a rudder is at the opposite end of a ship from the bowsprit).

See also 
 List of Antarctic and sub-Antarctic islands

References

Islands of the South Sandwich Islands
Volcanoes of the Atlantic Ocean
Volcanoes of South Georgia and the South Sandwich Islands
Uninhabited islands of South Georgia and the South Sandwich Islands